Primož Kobe (born 1981) is a Slovenian long-distance runner. He was born in Novo Mesto. He competed in the marathon at the 2012 Summer Olympics in London.

References

1981 births
Living people
Sportspeople from Novo Mesto
Slovenian male long-distance runners
Olympic athletes of Slovenia
Athletes (track and field) at the 2012 Summer Olympics
Slovenian male marathon runners